Fernando Plaza (born 22 November 1947) is a Spanish racing cyclist. He rode in the 1974 Tour de France.

References

External links
 

1947 births
Living people
Spanish male cyclists
Place of birth missing (living people)
Sportspeople from the Province of Burgos
Cyclists from Castile and León